Jiří Pleskot (3 May 1922 – 1 December 1997) was a Czech actor. He appeared in over 60 films and television shows 1958 and 1990.

Selected filmography
 The End of Agent W4C (1967)
 Hotel for Strangers (1967)
 Days of Betrayal (1973)
 Léto s Kovbojem (1976)

References

External links

1922 births
1997 deaths
Czech male film actors
People from Rakovník District
20th-century Czech male actors
Czechoslovak male actors